The Bald eagle, also known as the American eagle, is a North American bird of prey.

Bald Eagle  may also refer to:

Places

Pennsylvania 
Bald Eagle, Pennsylvania, in Blair County
Bald Eagle Township, Pennsylvania, in Clinton County
Bald Eagle Creek (Little Juniata River tributary)
Bald Eagle Creek (West Branch Susquehanna River tributary)
Bald Eagle Formation, a geologic bedrock unit in central Pennsylvania
Bald Eagle Mountain
Bald Eagle State Forest, in Centre, Clinton, Mifflin, Snyder, and Union Counties
Bald Eagle State Park, in Centre County
Bald Eagle Valley

Elsewhere 
Bald Eagle, Kentucky
Bald Eagle, Minnesota

Other uses
 Bald Eagle (clipper), an American sailing ship
Bald Eagle (horse), American Champion Thoroughbred raceflag
 Woapalanne (d. 1779), known as Chief Bald Eagle, Lenape tribal leader